Yacine Slatni (born 3 November 1973 in Annaba) is a retired Algerian professional footballer. He last played as a defender for AC Oulu.

Slatni was involved in a clash of heads that resulted in the death of Hocine Gacemi in a match against JS Kabylie on 19 March 2000. He made 26 appearances for the Algeria national football team.

National team statistics

Honours
 Winner of Algerian League in 1999 with MC Alger.

References

External links

1973 births
Living people
Algerian footballers
Algeria international footballers
Association football defenders
Expatriate footballers in Finland
NA Hussein Dey players
CR Belouizdad players
USM Annaba players
Algerian expatriate footballers
2000 African Cup of Nations players
2002 African Cup of Nations players
People from Annaba
Algerian expatriate sportspeople in Finland
MC Alger players
AC Oulu players
Algerian Ligue Professionnelle 1 players
Veikkausliiga players
21st-century Algerian people